Usha Mangeshkar (born 15 December 1935) is an Indian singer who has recorded many Marathi, Manipuri, Hindi, Bengali, Kannada, Nepali, Bhojpuri, Gujarati and Assamese songs.

Personal life

Usha Mangeshkar is an Indian singer. She is the fourth child of Pandit Deenanath Mangeshkar and Shevanti (Shudhamati). She is the youngest sister among Lata Mangeshkar, Asha Bhosle, Meena Khadikar and elder to her music-director brother Hridaynath Mangeshkar. Usha has a strong interest in painting.

Career
She came into the spotlight as a playback singer after singing some devotional songs for the low-budget movie Jai Santoshi Maa (1975), which became an all-time blockbuster. She was nominated for the Filmfare Best Female Playback Singer award for her song "Main to Aarti" in that film. She sang the same songs for that movie's remake in 2006.

She is known for her famous song "Mungda" and songs for the Marathi movie Pinjara.
She is  famous  also for her  song Chupi Chupi Gori Kane in Odia Film "Abhiman"(1977).
She had also produced musical drama Phoolwanti for Doordarshan.

Awards and nominations
 BFJA Awards for Best Female Playback Singer for Jai Santoshi Maa (1975)
 Nominated for Filmfare Award for Best Female Playback Singer for the song "Main to Aarti" from Jai Santoshi Maa (1975)
 Nominated for Filmfare Award for Best Female Playback Singer for the song "Mangta Hai To Aaja" from Inkaar (1977)
 Nominated for Filmfare Award for Best Female Playback Singer for the song "Humse Nazar To Milao" from Ikraar (1980)
 Winner of Mirchi Awards 2020 for Lifetime Achievement Awards

Popular songs
"Bhabhi Aayi Badi Dhoom Dhaam Se" from Subah Ka Tara (1954)
"Aplam Chaplam" from Azaad (1955), duet with Lata Mangeshkar
"Kahe Tarasaye Jayara" from Chitralekha (1964), duet With Asha Bhosle
"Chali Chali Kaisi Hawa Yeh Chali" from Bluff Master (1963)
"Namana Laaj Yestari" from Maitighar (1966)
"Yariva nan mana", Kannada song from Kranthiveera Sangolli Rayanna (1967)
"Main To Aarti Utaroon" from Jai Santoshi Maa (1975)
"Asom Deshor Bagisare", Assamese song from Chameli Memsaab (1975)
"Mungda" from Inkaar (1977) 
"Na Na Jaane Na Doongi" from Priyatama (1977)
"Tu Jo Bole Han To Han" from Priyatama (1977)
"Sultana Sultana" from Taraana (1979)
"Muje Pyar Ka Tohfa Deke" from Kaala Patthar (1979)
"Pakdo, Pakdo, Pakdo" from Naseeb (1981)
"Rang Jamake Jayenge" from Naseeb (1981)
"Goro Ki Na Kaalon Ki" from Disco Dancer (1982)
"Sona-No Sooraj Ugyo" from Noorani Chehra
"Aavo Aavo Momino Sahu Aavore" from Noorani Chehra
Also did scores of Marathi songs for Dada Kondke, including the most famous "Dhagala Lagli Kala" and "Tumhawar Keli Me Marji Bahar" from Pinjara. In 2008, Usha collaborated with Shaukat (Sam) Kassam for the CD Noorani Chehra, to commemorate the Golden Jubilee of the Agha Khan.

References

External links
 

Living people
Assamese playback singers
Bollywood playback singers
Singers from Mumbai
Nepali-language singers from India
Marathi playback singers
Marathi-language singers
Indian women playback singers
Goan people
Usha
1935 births
Women musicians from Maharashtra
Indian women classical singers
20th-century Indian singers
21st-century Indian women scientists
21st-century Indian scientists
20th-century Indian women singers
21st-century Indian women singers
21st-century Indian singers